ColdHubs Ltd. is a Owerri-based company that provides solar-powered cold storage for small scale farmers.

History 
ColdHubs was founded in 2015 in Owerri, Imo State, Nigeria. It also has offices in Fort Collins, Colorado.

Services 
ColdHubs provide cooling services to small scale farmers and fishermen, who rent 20-kg-capacity crates to store their products at the hubs that are available 24 hours per day, 365 days per year.

Coldhubs operates at 54 locations, in 22 states throughout Nigeria; site locations are near farms. The three-metre-square units can each hold three tons of food, the sun's power cools the units during day time and charges batteries that operate the refrigeration during the evening time.

People 
Coldhubs was founded and is run by, former farmer, Nnaemeka Ikegwuonu. As of 2021 it employed 66 people.

Awards 
In 2017 ColdHubs was shortlisted for the UK Royal Academy of Engineering's Africa Prize for Engineering Innovation. In it won the 2020 Waislitz Global Citizen Disruptor Award and was the inaugural AYuTe Africa Challenge winner in 2021.

See also 
 Smallholding
 Solar air conditioning

References 

Solar energy companies
Nigerian companies established in 2015